DXKN (98.3 FM), broadcasting as 98.3 Gold FM, is a radio station owned and operated by Kalayaan Broadcasting System. The station's studio is located along Bonifacio St., Tagum.

It was formerly known as X 88.7 from 2008 to 2012, when it transferred from 88.7 FM to 98.3 FM & rebranded as Gold FM.

References

Radio stations in Davao del Norte
Radio stations established in 2008